Aurantisolimonas is a Gram-negative, strictly aerobic and non-motile genus of bacteria from the family of Chitinophagaceae with one known species (Aurantisolimonas haloimpatiens). Aurantisolimonas haloimpatiens has been isolated from soil from Gyeongsangbuk-do in Korea.

References

Chitinophagia
Bacteria genera
Monotypic bacteria genera
Taxa described in 2018